Anni Pede-Erdkamp (born January 14, 1940) is a former West German long-distance runner who is recognized by the International Association of Athletics Federations as having set a world best in the marathon on September 16, 1967, with a time of 3:07:27 in Waldniel, West Germany.

Biography
Pede and Monika Boers were asked by Ernst van Aaken, an early proponent of women's running, to participate in a race organized by his running club. According to German sports historian Karl Lennartz, journalists skeptical of 13-year-old Maureen Wilton's recent world best in Toronto, Canada asked van Aaken if women and teenagers were capable of such a performance. Mocked and derided for claiming that faster times were indeed possible, van Aaken chose Pede, a middle-distance runner and mother of two, and Boers, a 19-year-old from the Netherlands, to prove himself correct. Although the German Athletic Association (Deutscher Leichtathletik-Verband) did not yet officially permit women to run, race officials did allow the two women to start 30 meters behind the men. Pede's mark was good enough for third overall and Boers finished in 3:19:36.3.

Notes

References

1940 births
West German female long-distance runners
World record setters in athletics (track and field)
German female marathon runners
Living people
20th-century German women